Jack Miller (born June 14, 1961, in Indianapolis), usually known as Dr. Jack Miller, is an American retired racing driver. He drove in the Indy Racing League from 1997 to 2001 and the Indianapolis 500 from 1997 to 1999. Miller is a practicing dentist and was accordingly "The Racing Dentist." For much of his racing career, he was sponsored by dental product companies including Crest and Water Pik.

Miller's best IRL finish was a 9th in 1998 at Charlotte. His best finish in the Indianapolis 500 was a 20th his rookie year of 1997. During his stay in Indy Lights he won the 1993 B-series championship. This class of racing was only run in 1993 and consisted of drivers using the previous March chassis as the rest of the series introduced new Lola chassis. Miller won the championship by virtue of being the only driver to compete in every race in a B-series car.

Miller's final IRL start came at Atlanta in 2001. Miller was involved in a 13-car crash, and suffered injuries that ended his racing career. He was planning on entering the 2001 Indianapolis 500, but withdrew after the crash and retired from driving.

In 2016, Miller co-founded Miller Vinatieri Motorsports with former Indianapolis Colts kicker Adam Vinatieri, with the team initially entering cars in the Formula 4 United States Championship, but later moving to the Road to Indy with entries into the U.S. F2000 National Championship and the Indy Pro 2000 Championship.

Miller's son, Jack William Miller, is also a racing driver and has driven for the Miller Vinatieri team since 2018.

Motorsports Career Results

American Open-Wheel
(key) (Races in bold indicate pole position)

IndyCar

Indy 500 results

References

3. "Reflections on the Driving Career of Dr. Jack Miller, the Racing Dentist - http://sopwithmotorsports.com/blog/indycar/item/133-indycar-remembering-dr-jack-miller-the-racing-dentist.html

External links
Driver Database Profile

1961 births
Living people
American dentists
IndyCar Series drivers
Indianapolis 500 drivers
Indy Lights drivers
Racing drivers from Indianapolis